Connie Price-Smith (born Constance Marie Price, June 3, 1962) is an American shot putter and discus thrower. Price-Smith is also a four-time Olympian. She graduated from Southern Illinois University-Carbondale in 1985.

Later career
Price-Smith was also named to the 2012 Olympic track & field team coach staff in London.  On July 21, 2015, she started her tenure as the head coach at the University of Mississippi.  She was named women's head coach for the United States team at the 2016 Summer Olympics, again in Rio de Janeiro.

In 2016, she was elected into the National Track and Field Hall of Fame.

International competitions

^ Reached the 1987 World Championship Final at discus but failed to register a distance.
Note: Results with a Q, indicate overall position in qualifying round.

References

External links

 
 
 

1962 births
Living people
American female discus throwers
American female shot putters
African-American female track and field athletes
Athletes (track and field) at the 1988 Summer Olympics
Athletes (track and field) at the 1991 Pan American Games
Athletes (track and field) at the 1992 Summer Olympics
Athletes (track and field) at the 1995 Pan American Games
Athletes (track and field) at the 1996 Summer Olympics
Athletes (track and field) at the 1999 Pan American Games
Athletes (track and field) at the 2000 Summer Olympics
Female sports coaches
Goodwill Games medalists in athletics
Olympic track and field athletes of the United States
Pan American Games track and field athletes for the United States
Pan American Games gold medalists for the United States
Pan American Games medalists in athletics (track and field)
People from St. Charles, Missouri
Southern Illinois University alumni
Sportspeople from Greater St. Louis
Track and field athletes from Missouri
Competitors at the 1998 Goodwill Games
Medalists at the 1991 Pan American Games
Medalists at the 1995 Pan American Games
Medalists at the 1999 Pan American Games
21st-century African-American people
21st-century African-American women
20th-century African-American sportspeople
20th-century African-American women